A kot (diminutive kotje) is a type of student housing privately rented during the academic or school year in Belgium. The word kot is used in both Belgian Dutch and Belgian French, but not in standard Dutch or standard French.

Etymology
The word comes from Flemish and means small shelter, nest, cabin (as in friet kot, a chip shed, or kot à poule, a chicken coop). It can also even refer to slums. This term specifically used in Belgium refers to a cupboard (un kot à balais, a broom cupboard) and by extension any small room  such as a student room. It emphasizes the narrow aspect which is typically encountered in such housing. 

These kots can be either individual or part of a shared house, in which a certain area is public (the kitchen, the toilets and showers, etc.) casually called "commu" (rooms shared in common).  

The word kot is still in use in the Dunkirk dialect, pronounced “kotsheu“ (a small kot), meaning a shed, a garden shed, a junk room.

Derived words include: 
the verb kotter ("to kot"), which means to rent and inhabit a kot, usually only during the week
the nouns kotteur and kotteuse refer to the tenant of a kot and often by extension to every student living outside the family home
the nouns cokotteur or cokotier  and cokotteuse (or cokotière), which mean housemate.

Project kots
Some community kots take part in a project, in particular in Louvain-la-Neuve. These "project kots" offer a large variety of activities. The project could be organizing a weekly spaghetti party, homework support, supporting a humanitarian organization. The only boundary is the creativity in management skills and the ability to bring people together.

References
Françoise Hiraux, Laurent Honnoré, Françoise Mirguet, La vie étudiante à Louvain, 1425-2000: chronique de l'Université (2002) Google Books
Georges Lebouc, Dictionnaire de belgicismes (2006), p. 363
Roger Silverstone, ed., Media, Technology and Everyday Life in Europe (2017) Google Books

Student housing
Belgian culture